Jorge Moises Piedra (born April 17, 1979) is a former Major League Baseball outfielder.

On April 11, Piedra became the second baseball player after Alex Sanchez to be suspended for testing positive for illegal performance-enhancing drugs under Major League Baseball's new drug policy. He was suspended for 10 days without pay as MLB's policy dictated for a first offense until November 2005. First offenses since that time now result in 80-game suspensions.

He signed a minor league contract with the Oakland Athletics on June 12, .

On January 4, Piedra signed a minor league contract with the Florida Marlins with an invitation to spring training. He was released on March 9, 2008.

See also
List of sportspeople sanctioned for doping offences

References

External links

1979 births
Living people
Baseball players from California
Major League Baseball outfielders
Colorado Rockies players
People from Sun Valley, Los Angeles
Colorado Springs Sky Sox players
Sacramento River Cats players
American sportspeople in doping cases
Major League Baseball players suspended for drug offenses 
Long Island Ducks players
Camden Riversharks players
Great Falls Dodgers players
San Bernardino Stampede players
Vero Beach Dodgers players
Daytona Cubs players
West Tennessee Diamond Jaxx players
Salem Avalanche players
Tulsa Drillers players
Notre Dame High School (Sherman Oaks, California) alumni